Tripoli Creek may refer to:

Rivers
In Canada:
In Ontario:
Tripoli Creek (Algoma District)
Tripoli Creek (Kenora District)